Jessica Park (born 21 October 2001) is an English professional footballer who plays as a forward for Women's Super League club Everton on loan from Manchester City and the England national team.

Club career
Park made her debut on 6 December 2017, coming on in a 3–2 win over Doncaster Belles in the League Cup.

Park signed her first professional contract with Manchester City, keeping her at the club until 2023, on 4 April 2020.

On 14 June 2022, Park signed a contract up until 2026. After signing she stated, "This is my club". On 15 July 2022, it was announced that she would spend the 2022–23 season on loan at Everton.

International career
On 27 September 2022, Park received her first senior international call-up for the friendly matches against the United States and the Czech Republic.

Park made her senior debut as an 89th minute substitute during a friendly match against Japan on 11 November 2022. Just over a minute later, she scored her first international goal, the fourth in a 4–0 victory.

Career statistics

Club
.

International
Statistics accurate as of match played 22 February 2023.

International goals
. England score listed first, score column indicates score after each Park goal.

Honours
Manchester City
Women's FA Cup: 2019–20
FA WSL Cup: 2021–22

England
Arnold Clark Cup: 2023

Individual
UEFA Women's Under-17 Championship Team of the Tournament: 2018

References

External links
Profile at the Manchester City F.C. website

English women's footballers
Women's association football midfielders
2001 births
Living people
Women's Super League players
Manchester City W.F.C. players
England women's youth international footballers